The Negrișoara is a right tributary of the river Dorna in Romania. It flows into the Dorna in Dorna Candrenilor.

References

Rivers of Romania
Rivers of Suceava County